Roberto Poletti (born July 29, 1971) is an Italian journalist and politician.

Biography
Poletti was born in Feltre, Italy.

The Beginnings
In the late 1980s, Poletti began to work with magazines and local radio stations in the province of Belluno, and for the journal Il Gazzettino.
His first important work is in 1991 when, at twenty years old, arrives in the journal L'indipendente of Vittorio Feltri.
Poletti, who meanwhile is working with Epoca, Panorama, Cento Cose, Energy and Prima Comunicazione, leaving L'Indipendente and moved to Brazil, in Rio de Janeiro, where on behalf of the Italian Chamber of Commerce of Sao Paulo coordinates a project a project communication and integration of Italians who emigrated to South America. He also conducts a newscast in Italian on a Brazilian television network, and he is a correspondent from Brazil of the newspapers: Il Gazzettino, Il Tempo, Il Giornale Di Sicilia, La Sicilia and L’Eco Di Bergamo, he returned in Italy in 1997, working for the journal La Padania.
A professional journalist since 1995, after the experience with Radio 24, the radio channel of Il Sole 24 Ore, he arrives in Telelombardia, where he leads the press in the morning Buongiorno Lombardia and the news programs in the early evening. He was also director of Radio Padania Libera, contributing to the success of the initial radio of Lega Nord.

The Success in Lombardy
Poletti establishes a direct relationship with the public, politicians and phone calls made in the studio without filters and without exchange. On numerous occasions in the studio brings workers in factories that are closing or students which are demonstrating.
In the autumn of 2004, he arrives on the national circuit with 7 Gold and the program Aria Pulita, where he manages to put together a real popular uprising to block a bipartisan proposal for the extension of electoral reimbursements also to elections. In December of that year, he left 

the studios of Legnano for the Channel Antenna 3 to conduct Carta Straccia.

Political career
In February 2006, Roberto Poletti accepts the nomination for election to the Federazione dei Verdi and he became a member following the resignation of Carlo Monguzzi. He was a member of the Committee on Culture, Science and Education and a member of the House Foreign Affairs Committee.
In the Chamber of Deputies collides with the Verdi and he reports to the public the internal scandals internal of the Parliament. On 30 October 2007 he joined the group the Sinistra Democratica, to prevent it from melting.
On February 3, 2008, he announcing on live TV that will leave the Chamber of Deputies publicly declaring to be ashamed of earning a salary so generous without being able to do anything in Parliament. So then, he writes a series of scandal investigations for the newspaper Libero.

The Return in Telelombardia and Antenna 3
From 2008 he holds a regular column in the newspaper every day on Libero, and he returned to TV working again for the political programs on Antenna 3 and Telelombardia.

References

1971 births
Living people
Italian journalists
Italian male journalists